The Staten Island Railway (SIR) is the only rapid transit line in the New York City borough of Staten Island and is operated by the Staten Island Rapid Transit Operating Authority, a unit of the Metropolitan Transportation Authority. The railway was historically considered a standard railroad line, but today only the western portion of the North Shore Branch, which is disconnected from the rest of the SIR, is used by freight and is connected to the national railway system.

While the first rail proposal for rail service on Staten Island was issued in 1836, construction did not begin until 1855 after the project was attempted a second time under the name Staten Island Railroad. This attempt was successful due to the financial backing of William Vanderbilt. The line opened in 1860 and ran from Tottenville to Vanderbilt's Landing and connected with ferries to Perth Amboy, New Jersey and New York, respectively. After the Westfield ferry disaster at Whitehall Street Terminal in 1871, the railroad went into receivership and was reorganized into the Staten Island Railway Company in 1873. In the 1880s, Erastus Wiman planned a system of rail lines encircling the island using a portion of the existing rail line, and organized the Staten Island Rapid Transit Railroad in 1880, in cooperation with the Baltimore & Ohio Railroad (B&O), which wanted an entry into New York. B&O gained a majority stake in the line in 1885, and by 1890 new extensions to the line were in service. In 1890, the Arthur Kill Bridge opened, connecting the island to New Jersey. This route proved to be a major freight corridor. After a period of financial turmoil in the 1890s which saw both B&O and the Staten Island Rapid Transit Railroad company enter bankruptcy, the railroad was restructured as the Staten Island Rapid Transit Railway (SIRT), and was purchased by the B&O in 1899.

In 1924, SIRT began electrification of its lines, to comply with the Kaufman Act, which had become law the previous year. New train cars, designed to be compatible with subway service, were ordered, and electric service was inaugurated on the system's three branches in 1925. Through the 1930s and 1940s grade-crossing elimination projects were completed on the three branches. During World War II, freight traffic on the SIRT increased dramatically, briefly making it profitable. In 1948, the New York City Board of Transportation took over all of the bus lines on Staten Island, resulting in a decrease in bus fares from five cents per zone to seven cents for the whole island. Riders of the SIRT flocked to the buses, resulting in a steep drop in ridership. Service on the branches was subsequently reduced. In 1953, the SIRT discontinued service on the North Shore Branch and South Beach Branch. The South Beach Branch was abandoned shortly thereafter while the North Shore Branch continued to carry freight. While the SIRT threatened to discontinue service on the Tottenville Branch, the service was preserved as New York City stepped in to subsidize the operation. The last grade crossings on the line were eliminated in 1965. In 1971, New York City purchased the Tottenville line, and the line's operation was turned over to the Staten Island Rapid Transit Operating Authority, a division of the state-operated Metropolitan Transportation Authority (MTA). Freight service continued until 1991.

Improvements were made under MTA operations. The line received its first new train cars since the 1920s, and several stations were renovated. The MTA rebranded the Staten Island Rapid Transit as the MTA Staten Island Railway (SIR) in 1994. Fares on the line between Tompkinsville and Tottenville were eliminated in 1997 with the introduction of the MetroCard. In 2010, fare collection was reintroduced at Tompkinsville. A new station on the main line, Arthur Kill, opened in 2017, replacing the deteriorated Nassau and Atlantic stations. It was the first new station opened on the main line in seventy years. While the railway does not serve residents on the western or northern sides of the borough, light rail and bus rapid transit have been proposed for these corridors. Freight service in northwestern Staten Island was restored in the 2000s.

Corporate history

First line: 1836–1885

Initial efforts: 1836–1860 
The railway's predecessor, the Staten Island Rail-Road Company, was incorporated on May 21, 1836. The charter called for the construction of a single or double-tracked line "commencing at some point in the town of Southfield, within one mile of the steamboat landing at the Quarantine, and terminating at some point in the town of Westfield; opposite Amboy." The proposed line would have run between the present-day locations of Clifton and Tottenville. The  route had an estimated cost of $300,000. However, the company lost its charter in 1838 because the railroad was not built within two years after it was incorporated.

Attempts to start a rail line on the island were restarted in 1849 and 1850, when residents of Perth Amboy and Staten Island held meetings concerning a possible Tottenville-to-Stapleton line. Like the previous attempt in 1836, they faced financial difficulties, and sought out the help of William Vanderbilt—a son of Cornelius "Commodore" Vanderbilt and a resident of Staten Island. Vanderbilt had conceived of such a railroad as a way to reduce the monopoly of the Camden and Amboy Railroad, which was the only mean of reaching Philadelphia. Passengers would take ferries from New York City to Amboy, the railroad to Camden, and finally a ferry to Philadelphia. Vanderbilt thought his railroad would cut travel times—passengers would take a ferry from New York to Staten Island, then take his railroad, before taking a ferry to Amboy—and eliminate the monopoly of the Camden and Amboy between New York City and its terminus in Amboy. Since the plan conceived by the local residents followed Vanderbilt's proposed route, he helped charter the Staten Island Railroad Company (SIRR) on August 2, 1851, in order to build the rail line. The articles of association for the company were filed on October 18, 1851.

In 1852, the line was expected to cost $322,195. Two possible route options were considered; the first would start at New Ferry Dock in Stapleton, before passing through Rocky Hollow, following the valley between Castleton and Southfield Heights before descending to New Dorp. After going  through the valley, the line would curve toward Amboy Road before curving southward, passing Billop House, and ending near Biddle's Grove and the Amboy ferries. The second route would start at Vanderbilt's Landing and run through Clifton to New Dorp.

The railroad's charter gave it two years to be built. Like the original plan for the line, however, difficulties were encountered. One problem was the acquisition of property for the line's right-of-way; many property owners refused to sell their land, blocking the proposed line. To prevent the loss of the line's charter, in 1853, the company successfully petitioned for a two-year extension to build the line. In 1853, a bill giving the company the right to operate ferries between New York and Staten Island was passed. Still facing difficulties, in January 1855 the company applied to the New York State Legislature for a three-year extension to complete the project. After all of the property required for the right-of-way was acquired, construction commenced in November 1855. The company, however, had run out of money to complete the line and asked Cornelius Vanderbilt—the sole Staten Island-to-Manhattan ferry operator—for a loan. Vanderbilt agreed to finance the railroad, but changed the northern terminal of the line from Stapleton to Vanderbilt's Landing, his ferry landing further east. Vanderbilt tried to stop competitors who had obtained a lease for the ferry at Vanderbilt's Landing before he could get a lease. He appointed James R. Robinson to build a structure to block his competitors, but on July 28, 1851, people tried to deconstruct the almost-finished structure and threatened to hurt Robinson if he tried to block them. In 1858, Cornelius's son William Vanderbilt was inducted onto the railroad's board of directors.

Opening: 1860 
Stockholders and officials took an inaugural ride on the double-track line between Vanderbilt's Landing and Eltingville on February 1, 1860, and passenger operations began on April 23 that year. At Vanderbilt's Landing, passengers continued their passage to Manhattan by ferry. The first locomotive was named "Albert Journeay", after the railroad's president. A second locomotive was added to the line on May 5, 1860; it was named "E. Bancker" after the company's vice-president. The remainder of the line was expected to be completed in a month.

Over the next month, the remainder of the line was built between Annadale and Pleasant Plains as a single-track line, with a passing siding at Huguenot, passing through mosquito-infested land laced with peat bogs and quicksand—an area known locally as Skunk's Misery. It took a lot of time and wood to built the sub-roadbed with logs. It was viewed as unlikely to be a worthwhile investment to double-track the line because of the low passenger volume south of New Dorp. South of Pleasant Plains, the line was double-tracked. The line was extended to Annadale on May 14, 1860, and was completed to Tottenville on June 2, 1860, with a formal opening of the railroad. The completion of the line to Tottenville allowed passengers to transfer to a ferry that crossed the Arthur Kill and allowed passage to Perth Amboy, New Jersey. Initially, services made eleven stops between Vanderbilt's Landing and Tottenville. Many stations were named after nearby large farms, such as Garretson's and Gifford's. The stations built at Eltingville and Annadale—whose namesakes, the Eltings family and Anna Seguine, were influential in paying for the construction of the rail line—were the most elaborate. The arrival of the railroad gave dignity to some locations on Staten Island; "Poverty Hollow" was renamed Rosebank, Oakwood became Oakwood Heights, and other places were renamed with the coming of the railroad.

In August 1860, the railroad was extended from the depot at Vanderbilt's Landing to the wharf, which allowed passengers to walk directly to the boat from the train instead of walking  along the sand. At the time, it took one and a half hours to get to Tottenville from Manhattan. Patronage of the rail line exceeded the greatest expectations of its projectors. On February 27, 1861, the New Jersey Locomotive Works gave notice of foreclosure on the two locomotives; Cornelius Vanderbilt interceded again and on September 4, 1861, the SIRR was placed into receivership with William Vanderbilt to prevent the loss of the locomotives and rolling stock to creditors. The Vanderbilts had taken stock in the railroad but in 1863, William Vanderbilt managed the receivership well enough for it to be discharged, with the debt paid off. As a result, the railroad became property of the Vanderbilts; facilities were enlarged under their leadership—an expansion made possible by increasing the capital stock to $800,000 from $350,000.

On October 5, 1861, in what might have been the first major accident on the railroad, Mary Austin, age 16, was killed by a train at Princess Bay as she crossed the tracks.

Ferry conflicts: 1860–1884 
Ferry service between Perth Amboy and Tottenville began in 1863, operated by the SIRR. It was necessary to have a direct connection between the trains and the infrequent ferries to and from Manhattan, but this was difficult during the beginning of operation. The ferries serving Vanderbilt's Landing were owned by the attorney George Law. Vanderbilt tried to operate a ferry service between Manhattan and Staten Island that would compete with Law's. He also started construction on a central dock on the island, but he abandoned the scheme after a storm destroyed the timber work. Only the large stone foundation remained; it was still visible at low tide in 1900.

Vanderbilt was eventually forced to sell his ferry service to Law after a franchise battle. After the battle, Vanderbilt lost interest in transit operations on Staten Island and he handed the ferry and railroad operations to his brother Jacob H. Vanderbilt, who was the president of the company until 1883. In March 1864, William Vanderbilt bought Law's ferries, bringing both the railroad and the ferries under the same company. In 1865, the railroad took over operation of the New York & Richmond Ferry Company, and would later assume direct responsibility for operating the ferry service to Manhattan. The Perth Amboy and Staten Island ferries were taken over by the railroad under the leadership of Jacob Vanderbilt, who increased service.

The SIRR and its ferry line were making a modest profit until the boiler of the ferry "Westfield" exploded at Whitehall Street Terminal on July 30, 1871, killing 85 and injuring hundreds. As president of the railway, Jacob Vanderbilt was arrested but was not charged. As a result of the disaster, on March 28, 1872, the railroad and the ferry went into receivership. On September 17, 1872, the property of the company was sold to George Law in foreclosure, with the exception of the ferry "Westfield", which was purchased by Horace Theall. Some time after, Law and Theall sold the SIRR and ferry to the Staten Island Railway Company (SIRW). Law had threatened to form a company of his own if the stockholders did not come to his terms promptly, but a deal was reached. The charter for the SIRW was created on March 20, 1873, and on April 1, 1873, Law transferred the SIRR's property to the SIRW for $480,000. The ferry operation was transferred to the newly formed Staten Island Railway Ferry Company. The ferry and rail services were split into separate rail companies to prevent problems with one from leading to the demise of the other, while ensuring that connecting service could still be provided for passengers.

During the American Civil War, a boat connected with the SIRW, the "Southfield", was sold to the government and converted into a gunboat; it was destroyed during an attack on Mississippi. In 1876, competition to the SIRW's ferry system emerged: Commodore Garner obtained possession of a ferry and ran the "D. R. Martin" on the East Shore. However, this ferry service was suddenly ended when Garner died. His boats were purchased by John Starin, who paid $5,000 for each of them, and obtained a franchise. He operated it until it was taken over by the Staten Island Rapid Transit Railroad Company (SIRTR) on August 1, 1884.

SIRT/B&O operation: 1880–1900

Organization: 1880–1884
By 1880, the SIRW was barely operational, and as a result New York State sued through Attorney General Hamilton Ward to have the company dissolved in May that year. The suit said the company had become "insolvent in September 1872, to have then surrendered its rights to others, and have failed to exercise those rights". The legal proceedings commenced after an injunction was obtained that restrained the creditors of the railway company from proceeding against it until after the suit of the people was determined. Although it was floundering, the railway become the centerpiece of a plan to develop the island by a Canadian, Erastus Wiman. In 1867, Wiman arrived in New York to oversee the main office of Dun, Barlow, and Company in New York. Wiman became one of the most prominent residents of Staten Island after moving into a mansion there. He was dubbed the "Duke of Staten Island," and was interested in developing the island; Wiman recognized that to succeed he would need to build a coordinated transportation hub with connections to New York City and New Jersey. To this end the Staten Island Rapid Transit Railroad Company (SIRTR) was organized on March 25, 1880 and incorporated on April 14, 1880.

Wiman's plan called for a system encircling the island using two miles of the SIRW between Vanderbilt's Landing and Tompkinsville. His plan also called for the centralization of all ferries from one terminal, replacing the six to eight terminals active near what is now St. George. Wiman approached Robert Garrett, president of the Baltimore & Ohio Railroad (B&O), to back the plan, and Garrett agreed. The SIRTR began to seek legislation to acquire various rights-of-way needed to implement Wiman's plan. At that time, Wiman's company neither owned nor controlled a railroad; If it gained a charter to build connections, it would have had nothing to connect to. The SIRTR then began surveying for the proposed routes; in April 1881, it acquired  of critical right-of-way directly from George Law. When Wiman explained his plan he secured a waterfront option from Law; however, Law refused to renew the option when it expired. To persuade Law to renew it, Wiman offered to name the place "St. George." Law was amused by the gesture and granted Wiman the option. In October 1882, Wiman made an application for a wharf to land passengers from the SIRTR's planned new ferry service to Manhattan.

Clarence T. Barrett, Henry P. Judah, and Theodore C. Vermilyen were appointed as commissioners to appraise the value of the land required by the SIRTR to extend the Staten Island Railway from Vanderbilt's Landing to Tompkinsville. Work on the line was delayed until the commissioners reported. The SIRTR filed a map of the proposed route at the office of the clerk of Richmond County. The line as planned would cross the lawn of Ms. Post on the North Shore of the island; on February 26, 1883, Mr. Franklin Bartlett and Mr. Clifford Bartlett, on behalf of Ms. Post, notified the court a change of route would be demanded.

On April 3, 1883, the SIRTR gained control of the SIRW and its boats. On the same date, at the annual meeting of the SIRW, Erasmus Wiman gained control of the railway by being elected to the board of Directors of the Railroad and becoming the railway's president. At the meeting, Wiman laid out his proposals for rail lines on Staten Island. He proposed extending the Staten Island Railway line to Hyatt Street in what is today Saint George. From there, a line would run through New Brighton and Snug Harbor along the island's North Shore. The line would then go inland, running parallel to the Kill Van Kull. Additional spur lines would have been built in the interior of the island based on where people settled. Wiman also proposed a bridge across Arthur Kill from Tottenville to Perth Amboy, replacing the ferry that operated there. This would have been part of a direct route between New York City and Philadelphia via Perth Amboy and South Amboy, with a new bridge over the Raritan River. In the days before the meeting, Wiman had gained 7,450 out of the 11,800 shareholders to elect him, surprising many of the directors of the railroad. By the end of the month, Wiman resigned from the SIRTR to avoid any conflict of interest. On June 27, 1883, a meeting of the directors of the SIRW and the SIRTR formally ratified the merger of the two companies under the leadership of Erastus Wiman, who was named president. On June 30, 1883, the SIRTR leased the SIRW for a term of 99 years, to become effective when the line opened between Clifton and Tompkinsville. The line between Vanderbilt's Landing and Tottenville continued to be operated by the SIRW.

While the control of the railroad included control of Vanderbilt's ferry, the North Shore Ferry was leased separately and was operated by Starin, whose lease was set to expire on May 1, 1884. On July 18, 1884, the SIRTR outbid Starin for the North Shore operation. As part of the purchase, ferry service would have been operated every forty minutes instead of every hour. The fare for the railroad and the ferry would have been ten cents, except between five and seven in the morning and evening, when it would have been seven cents. Starin continued to fight the lease in the courts for several years.

On May 5, 1885, the Perth Amboy Railroad was incorporated in New York to build a -long line connecting the SIRW in Tottenville to Perth Amboy in New Jersey by bridging over the Arthur Kill. The railroad was incorporated with a capital stock of $1 million. This railroad line was never built, and was possibly in interest of the Pennsylvania Railroad. The Perth Amboy Railroad was to be an alternate freight route to avoid congestion at Harsimus Cove and through Elizabeth.

Expansion: 1884–1900
A controlling interest in the SIRTR was obtained by the B&O in November 1885 through purchases of stock. On November 21, 1885, Robert Garrett, President of the B&O, leased the SIRTR to the B&O for 99 years, which gave the B&O access to New York, allowing it to compete with the Pennsylvania Railroad (PRR). Wiman needed the proceeds of the sale to pay for the construction of the North Shore Branch. In 1885, Jacob Vanderbilt retired as President of the SIRW. The new lines opened by the B&O were operated by the SIRTR, while the original line from Clifton to Tottenville was called the SIRW, which was maintained as a separate corporation. The passenger cars used by the SIRW were leased by the SIRTR.

Construction of the North Shore Branch began on March 17, 1884, after a number of legal proceedings; a party of surveyors started marking out the grades and broke ground for the roadbed. The rights of a horse car line to operate in Richmond Terrace were bought to build the line; the right of way followed the island's North Shore and reached a ferry to Elizabeth, New Jersey that had been operating since the mid-1700s. The company underwent a contest in litigation to acquire property for the line to pass over the cove at Palmer's run. Some properties in Port Richmond were acquired, displacing several home and business owners. A farm on the northwestern corner of Staten Island at Old Place—which was renamed Arlington by the B&O—was also purchased.

Grading work on the section between Clifton (previously Vanderbilt's Landing) and Tompkinsville began at this time, and during early 1884, construction continued with such energy that this section, which had been expected to open on September 1, opened on July 31 that year. The first train on the section contained the managers and officers, a few invited guests, and several passengers who had boarded prior to the train's arrival at Tompkinsville. The ride took three and a half minutes. The extension opened for passenger service on August 1, 1884. The opening of the line made the SIRTR's 99-year lease of the SIRW effective; under this agreement, the railroad to Tottenville and its properties became part of the rapid transit system.

Wiman wanted to extend the line to St. George so all of the branches under the company's control could meet in one place and connect with the ferries to Manhattan. Most of the course of the line, however, had followed the shore along the bluffs, where ground had to be made upon to build the road. State laws could not grant the right to run a railroad through the property of the United States, hindering construction by the grounds of the lighthouse department near Tompkinsville. The company secured an Act of Congress permitting them to tunnel through a hill a near the shore. The grant for the tunnel was surrounded with restrictions that slowed progress. The tunnel was wide enough to fit two trains side by side at a time. The cost of the project was $190,000. On November 16, 1884, Wiman, James M. Davis, Sir Roderick Cameron, Herman Clark, and Louis de Jonge incorporated the Saint George Improvement Company to handle the land and waterfront, which had been recently purchased from the estate of George Law. The new company was to handle the building of a new ferry terminal at Saint George.

Opening of the North Shore and South Beach Branches 

On January 16, 1886, constructing engineers for the SIRTR said that if weather continued to be good, trains on the East Shore Branch from Clifton and North Shore Branch trains from Elm Park would be able to run to St. George Terminal by February 1.

The North Shore Branch was completed in 1885 and opened for service on February 23, 1886, with trains terminating at Elm Park. Travel times between Manhattan and Elm Park were reduced from 90 minutes with the old ferry system to 39 minutes. On March 7, 1886, the key piece of Wiman's plan, the St. George Terminal, opened; North Shore trains operated between Elm Park and St. George, and East Shore trains operated between St. George and Tottenville. In early 1886, in anticipation of the opening of the terminal and the consolidation of operations, the former Staten Island Railway stations from Clifton to Tottenville were upgraded from low-level platforms to high-level platforms to match the platforms on the new lines. In mid-1886, the North Shore Branch opened its new terminal at Erastina. In 1889–1890, a station was built at the South Avenue grade crossing at Arlington as the tracks were extended to the Arthur Kill Bridge. At Arlington, trains were reversed for their trip back to St. George. Even a few years after its opening, most trains terminated at Erastina.

A -long branch, then known as the Arrochar Branch, was opened to Arrochar on January 1, 1888, as a double-tracked line. The branch split off at Clifton Junction; it had two stops—Fort Wadsworth and Arrochar. In its first year, the branch carried heavy traffic, especially during the summer months. As evidenced by a map from 1884, the South Beach Branch was originally intended to run to Prominard Street in Oakwood Beach. The extension, however, was not built because the SIRTR could not gain the Vanderbilt family's approval to cross their New Dorp Beach farm. Instead, the line was only built as far as South Beach. During fiscal year 1893, the SIRTR purchased land to extend the line  to South Beach and the  South Beach Branch was completed in 1894.

Improvements on the line to Tottenville 
In 1886, Grasmere station opened on the Tottenville Line for a cost of $555.35.

To improve service, under B&O control, a large portion of the line was double-tracked. A second track was built between New Dorp and a point near Clifton in 1887 and 1888. Two new stations, Garretson and New Dorp, were opened the following year. In 1893, to pay for more improvements—including double-tracking and a new station at Tottenville—the SIRW issued a mortgage. In 1895, land in St. George and Stapleton was acquired for yard space and station use. Between June 1895 and December 1895, the line was double tracked to Annadale.

In 1896, the terminal at Tottenville was moved  to provide closer connections to the Perth Amboy Ferry and to provide new ferry slips. The terminal had been located on the east side of Main Street but as part of the work it was moved to Bentley Street. The change had a negative effect on local businesses, changing the character of Main Street and marking a decline of its commercial viability. To build the new terminal, property had to be acquired. In 1910, the SIRW stopped using the land for the old ferry docks at Main Street.

Extension to New Jersey 

The B&O made various proposals for a railroad between Staten Island and New Jersey. The accepted plan consisted of a -long section from the Arthur Kill to meet the Jersey Central at Cranford, through Roselle Park and Linden in Union County. In October 1888, the B&O created the subsidiary Baltimore and New York Railway (B&NY) to build the line, which was to be operated by the SIRTR. Construction started in 1889 and the line was finished later that year. After three years of effort by Wiman, Congress passed a law on June 16, 1886, authorizing the construction of a  swing bridge over the Arthur Kill. The start of construction was delayed for nine months because it awaited approval of the Secretary of War, and another six months due to an injunction from the State of New Jersey. Construction had to continue through the brutal winter of 1888 because Congress had set a completion deadline of June 16, 1888; two years after signing the bill. The bridge was completed three days early on June 13, 1888.

When it opened, the Arthur Kill Bridge was the largest drawbridge ever constructed; it cost $450,000 and was constructed without fatalities. The bridge consisted of five pieces of masonry, the center one being midstream with the draw resting on it. Construction of the draw needed 656 tons of iron, and 85 tons were needed for each of the approaches. Trains were planned to start running on the bridge by September 1, but because the approaches were not finished, this was delayed until January 1, 1890, when the first train from St. George to Cranford Junction crossed the bridge. The North Shore Branch was opened to freight traffic on March 1, 1890. On July 1, 1890, all of the B&O's freight traffic started using the line. Freight service began running through from Baltimore to St. George, running via the Reading Railroad and the Central Railroad of New Jersey between Park Junction in Philadelphia and Cranford Junction in New Jersey.

The B&O paid the SIRTR 10 cents-per-ton trackage to use the line from Arthur Kill to St. George. Once the Arthur Kill Bridge was completed, pressure was brought upon the United States War Department by the Lehigh Valley Railroad and the PRR to have the newly built bridge torn down and replaced with a bridge with a different design, claiming it was an obstruction for the navigation of coal barges past Holland Hook on the Arthur Kill. Their efforts were not successful.

In September 1890, Wiman secured the rights for a tunnel between Brooklyn and Staten Island; these tunnel rights were acquired by the New Jersey and Staten Island Junction Railroad Company. In May 1900, the PRR and other railroads secured an informal agreement to use the North Shore Branch from the Arthur Kill Bridge and the tunnel rights for a tunnel to 39th Street in Brooklyn. This was intended to allow freight trains to travel directly between Boston and Washington.

Reorganization 
The B&O was bankrupt by February 1896; in its attempt to reach the New York market, its western lines fell into disrepair. J.P. Morgan replaced the railroad's top management and refinanced it. The new terminal at St. George was completed in 1896 after work was contracted for the project in fiscal year 1893. The building was designed by the architects Carrere and Hastings, and was built with ironwork framing. At the time, it was the largest terminal in the United States to have ferry, rail, vehicular, pedestrian and trolley services. Trolley companies on Staten Island insisted on access to the new terminal, but were rebuffed by the B&O. The issue went to court, and the B&O ended up splitting the cost for the trolley terminal and the long viaduct with the trolley operators. Prior to October 1897 passengers placed their tickets into ticket choppers at stations to pay their fare. Afterwards, conductors collected tickets.

In 1895, trolley service was inaugurated on Staten Island; it attracted passengers from the SIRTR, ending the railroad's monopoly. As a result, the railroad went into bankruptcy. On April 20, 1899, the railroad company and all of the real and personal property held in the company was sold at auction for $2,000,000 to representatives of the B&O. The railroad already owned the line from Elizabethport, New Jersey to South Beach, including the Arthur Kill Bridge. At the time, it was rumored the B&O trains would be rerouted from Communipaw station to Saint George. There was no change in the SIRTRC's management after the purchase. On July 1, 1899, the SIRTR defaulted on its payment of interest on its second mortgage bonds, and its lease of the Staten Island Railway ended on July 14 when it was put into receivership. On July 31, 1899, the Staten Island Rapid Transit Railway Company—also shortened to Staten Island Rapid Transit, or SIRT–was incorporated for the purpose of operating the SIRTR, with the transaction taking place on August 1, 1899. The section of the SIRT's line between St. George and Clifton Junction was jointly operated with the SIRW.

Modernization: 1900–1949

Pennsylvania Railroad control: 1900–1913

Pennsylvania acquisition 
Improvements were made to the SIRT after the Pennsylvania Railroad (PRR) under the leadership of president Alexander Cassatt took control of the B&O. Cassatt was named president of the PRR in 1899, and he allied with the New York Central Railroad for a "community of interest" plan. Cassatt wanted to end the rebate practice being undertaken by Standard Oil and Carnegie Steel—both larger shippers—that kept the freight rates extremely low. To achieve this, the two railroads bought stock in smaller, weaker trunk line railroads. The New York Central bought stock in the Reading Company, while the PRR bought stock in the Chesapeake and Ohio Railway, the Norfolk Southern Railway, and in the B&O—including the SIRT and the ferries on Staten Island. The plan worked; the average freight rate for the two companies rose. Cassatt first purchased B&O stock in 1899, most of it being under PRR control by 1901. After the PRR took more direct control of the B&O, including the SIRT; in May 1901, improvements were made to the rail line. PRR control of the line decreased as a new PRR president had different priorities, and in 1906, the PRR sold half of its B&O stock to the Union Pacific Railroad. The remainder of the PRR's stock in the B&O was sold to the Union Pacific in 1913.

Improvements 
Under PRR control, the B&O was profitable again and became a stronger railroad. The PRR allowed the B&O's newly developed properties to remain intact. On October 13, 1902, the SIRT started a trial passenger service from Plainfield, New Jersey to St. George, running via the Jersey Central past Cranford Junction. The SIRT operated four trains every day, except for Sunday, with direct connections with the B&O's Royal Blue service between New York City and Washington, D.C. at Plainfield. These trains consisted of a locomotive and two passenger coaches. While this service was in operation the B&O sold tickets for its main line trains at the railroad's ferry terminals in Brooklyn, at South Ferry, and at St. George. The service was discontinued in 1903 because it was unprofitable. The PRR bought four large double-decker steamers to halve the travel time on the Staten Island Ferry. Even though the PRR improved ferry service, the B&O was ejected from the Whitehall Street terminal on October 25, 1905, when the city took ownership of the ferry and terminals. The city built a new St. George Terminal for $2,318,720.

The PRR increased the number of daily trips to 28, and in 1902, it began contemplating the electrification of the rail line. The PRR's investment in the southern portion of the Perth Amboy sub-division was credited for the increased development of the South Shore of Staten Island. As such, in about 1902, a new station was constructed at Whitlock to serve a new community being built by the Whitlock Realty Company on the South Shore. The development company incentivized prospective buyers to bid on newly built houses by promising a year's free commuting between Manhattan and Whitlock for the first 25 houses. In December 1912, the SIRT petitioned the Public Service Commission (PSC) to allow the railway to abandon the station and replace it with a station named Bay Terrace  to the south. The change was made, anticipating a shift in the center of population in the community. A hearing to hear the application was held by the PSC on December 18.

On February 21, 1907, the Staten Island Railway petitioned the Public Service Commission (PSC) to get permission to move the Dongan Hills stop from its location south of Seaview Avenue to a location  to the north in between Seaview Avenue and Garretson Avenue. On March 12, 1907, the PSC granted its permission.

In September 1909, the New York State Public Service Commission (PSC) allowed the B&O to acquire 227 shares of the Staten Island Railway's capital stock, giving the B&O all of the railway's stock except for the few shares that had to be held by officers. Practically all of the Staten Island Railway's stock had been purchased by the B&O by 1906.

After 1900, several new houses were built in the community of Annadale and several parts of the Little Farms development. In 1910, as part of the development, the building company built a new railroad station. As a result, on March 22, 1910, the SIRT petitioned the PSC to allow it to discontinue its service at Annadale station and replace it with a new station of the same name  to the west. On November 18, 1910, trains started stopping at a new station at Annadale that was built by the Wood Harmon Company the previous summer, which was located on the eastbound side of the track. This station replaced the station on the westbound track. As part of the construction of the new station, the operation of the switches where the line narrowed from two tracks to one began to be done from the station instead of being done manually. In addition, in 1910, a new freight house went into operation at Clifton, and new  rails were installed as far south as Richmond Valley on the Perth Amboy Division. These new rails, which were  heavier than the rails already in place on the southern section of the Perth Amboy Division, were expected to reduce the jarring of cars.

The PSC held a public hearing on December 16, 1910, to consider a proposal to eliminate grade crossings at Crook's crossing on Amboy Avenue in Great Kills, Clove Avenue in Grasmere, and Amboy Avenue in Huguenot. Commissioner of Public Work L.L. Tribus and Borough President Cromwell had started the push to eliminate grade crossings in Staten Island, which was approved by officials of the Staten Island Railway. The Board of Estimate had approved an appropriation to create a tentative plan. In the previous session of the State Legislature, a bill was passed allocating $250,000 for the state's portion of a fund to eliminate grade crossings in New York City, of which $200,000 was for Queens and $50,000 was for Staten Island. As such, $100 million would be available for the elimination of grade crossings in the two boroughs. At the time, there were 89 grade crossings on Staten Island, of which 14 were protected by sign boards, 44 by bells, 14 by flagmen, and 17 by gates. 100 people were injured and 56 people were killed in accidents at grade crossings from 1907 to 1910.

On March 6, 1911, work began on the elimination of a grade crossing at Amboy Avenue in Huguenot, which the PSC had ordered to be eliminated, as it was considered the most dangerous crossing on the island. Work was to be done quickly with the intent of completing the project by the end of summer. The project was estimated to cost $78,240, with $19,560 in funding coming from the state. The PSC had also ordered the elimination of a grade crossing at Great Kills with Crooke's crossing; work on the project was expected to begin shortly.

On March 24, 1911, an automatic block signal system manufactured by the Hall Signal Company was put into use between Pleasant Plains and Tottenville, eliminating the need for a telegraph block signal office at Atlantic station. The new signaling system reduced the work required for telegraph operators on the line to report when trains moved in and out of signal blocks. This system had already been in use on the North Shore Branch from St. George to Arlington, and the South Beach Branch from St. George to South Beach for some time.

In July 1911, the Public Service Commission (PSC) ordered the SIRT to install gates at several grade crossings on the North Shore Division to increase safety and reduce the frequent occurrence of accidents. This followed a PSC order to have flagmen staff the grade crossing at Amboy Avenue in Huguenot and Crooke's crossing in Great Kills at all times. Bids on projects to eliminate these crossings had been advertised earlier, but no work had yet started on them. There were 42 public grate crossings on the SIRT, and 43 on the SIR, in addition to 34 on private property. The PSC sent inspectors to investigate every crossing in the city with considerable traffic with the goal of eliminating all grade crossings in September 1911. The PSC's goal was to either have the SIRT eliminate all grade crossings or have them install gates at dangerous crossings. Plans for the elimination of the crossings in Huguenot and Great Kills were prepared, and work was expected to begin shortly.

In November 1911, the Public Service Commission gave notice for a hearing on November 23 to consider whether the Staten Island Railway Company and the Staten Island Rapid Transit Railway Company should electrify their lines, and whether any additional terminal facilities, tracks and switches were needed. This issue came up as a result of a complaint made by Reverend Father Charles A. Cassidy about noise from the switching of cars and steam locomotives in the St. George freight yards. In December 1911, the PSC ordered that the Staten Island Railway Company and the Staten Island Rapid Transit Railway Company consider electrifying their lines. A public hearing for this matter was set for January 15, 1912.

On December 12, 1911, following a series of hearings held between October 30 and December 4, the PSC ruled that grade crossings on Staten Island had to be protected. The hearings had been held following a petition made by residents of Prince Bay and Pleasant Plains after two boys were seriously injured when a train struck a stagecoach they were riding at the Sharrot Avenue crossing in Pleasant Plains. The PSC ordered that, as of March 15, 1912, gates had to be placed at Centre Street in Clifton, Sea View Avenue and Garretson Avenue in Dongan Hills, at Rose Avenue in New Dorp, at Giffords Lane in Great Kills, at Huguenot Avenue in Huguenot, at Prince Bay Avenue in Prince Bay, and at Amboy Road in Pleasant Plains on the Perth Amboy Division. In addition, the SIRT and SIR were required to have signal bells placed at Fisher Avenue in Tottenville, at Old Mill Road in Richmond Valley, Annadale Road in Annadale, and Ocean Avenue in New Dorp on the Perth Amboy Division, and have a flagman placed at each of these crossings from 7 a.m. to 7 p.m.. A flagman also had to be in place at the crossing at Main Street in Tottenville at all times. The PSC also ordered that, as of January 15, 1912, gates had to be installed at Newark Avenue and Douglas Avenue in Elm Park, and at Central Avenue in Mariners' Harbor on the North Shore Division, and at Tompkins Avenue in Fort Wadsworth, St. Mary's Avenue, Clifton Avenue, and Pennsylvania Avenue in Rosebank, Maple Avenue in Clifton, and Wave Avenue and Prospect Street in Stapleton on the South Beach Division. In addition, signal bells had to be installed at Chestnut Avenue in Clifton on the South Beach Division, and Granite Avenue in Elm Park on the North Shore Division.

In May 1912, work began on the installation of the new signaling system between Clifton Junction and Pleasant Plains. In order to allow for the installation of the new signaling, the experimental Lacroix automatic signaling system, which had been installed between Dongan Hills and Grasmere, would be removed.

In August 1912, the New York City Board of Estimate provided notice that it would hold a hearing on September 19 on the Staten Island Railway Company's application to add an additional track between Amboy Road in Pleasant Plains and Huguenot Avenue in Huguenot. In October 1912, work installing the new signaling system on the Perth Amboy Division was complete, with the exception of the single-track segment between Annadale and Pleasant Plains, which had a switch at Huguenot. The remaining section was scheduled to receive the new signaling once the completion of the grade-crossing elimination project in Huguenot and the completion of a second track between Annadale and Pleasant Plains. In October 1912, the Board of Estimate held a hearing on the Staten Island Railway Company's application to double-track its line from Pleasant Plains to Huguenot. A hearing had previously been held on the company's application for Amboy Avenue in Huguenot by itself. Work on that grade separation project was being completed rapidly, with the concrete abutments for the railroad bridge being almost completed and large steel girders being ready to be put into place. Work to grade the right-of-way for the second track was extended from the Amboy Avenue grade crossing in Huguenot past Prince Bay station. Work to lay the second track was expected to begin following the passing of the application by the Board of Estimate. With the completion of the double-tracking, trains would no longer have to wait at sidings at Annadale and Pleasant Plains for trains in the opposite direction to proceed.

In November 1912, the Board of Estimate issued a notice for the final hearing on SIRT's application to double-track the Annadale to Pleasant Plains section, which would take place on December 5. No one had spoken in opposition to the plan at the October hearing. The contract between New York City and the Staten Island Railway Company would have the company pay the city $500 three months after the Mayor signed the contract, with a sum of $100 for each crossing the second track would pass over or an annual amount of $800 from the date of the contract's signing until October 28, 1934. The crossings that would be crossed were Woodvail Avenue, Sharrott Avenue and Amboy Avenue in Pleasant Plains, Bay View Avenue and Manee Avenue in Prince Bay, and Huguenot Avenue and Amboy Avenue in Huguenot. Work on the elimination of the grade crossing at Amboy Avenue was in progress, and new girders were being put into place. Work to grade the second track was completed as far south as Prince Bay station. On December 17, 1912, the State Supreme Court in Brooklyn received an application for the appointment of a commission to assess and appraise the properties needed for the widening of Amboy Road, which would be part of the project to abolish the grade crossing there. It was expected that the road would open around January 1, 1913.

On December 26, 1912, the City of New York granted the SIRT the right to construct a second track between Huguenot and Pleasant Plains, with completion expected in three years. The grant was for 25 years but this project was not completed until 1934.

On March 25, 1913, work began on the double tracking of the Perth Amboy Division between Huguenot and Annadale. Work was expected to be done to complete the second track from Prince Bay to Pleasant Plains shortly afterwards. The automatic block signal system would be extended over the new second track. At the same time, work began on eliminating Crookes crossing in Great Kills. Crookes crossing, which was located between Oakwood and Great Kills station, crossed the train tracks on a diagonal with a descending grade from both sides. This was considered the deadliest crossing on Staten Island, especially as car traffic became heavier on Amboy Road. The work to eliminate the crossing would consist of the raising of the grade of Amboy Road above the rail line. Work was expected to be completed before the middle of the summer in 1913.

Work on the grade crossing project at Amboy Avenue was completed by May 1913 at the cost of $100,000. Amboy Avenue now passed under the rail line at this point. This was the first grade crossing eliminated on the SIRT. Some time earlier, at a PSC hearing, it was recommended that the SIRT consider eliminating eleven additional grade crossings, with those on the Amboy Division being at Washington Avenue in Annadale, at Liberty Avenue in Dongan Hills, and at Clove Avenue in Grasmere.

On June 18, 1913, trains began running over the new double track between Annadale and Prince Bay, leaving the section between Prince Bay and Pleasant Plains as the only single-track section on the Perth Amboy Division. Another tower was planned to be installed at Pleasant Plains as part of a series of improvements at that station. The passenger station would be moved to the existing freight station, and a new freight station would be constructed on the opposite side of the track. As part of the project, grades were adjusted, and the roadbed was well ballasted and had heavy rail tracks installed, improving its condition to the higher standard that was maintained on the rest of the line. In July 1913, a group of Annadale residents appealed to the PSC for the restoration of the telegraph station at Annadale.

On August 7, 1913, work began on the construction of a new two-story switch tower was being installed at the former site of the station at Amboy Avenue. The tower would automatically control the interlocking being installed between Pleasant Plains and Princes Bay, and was to be similar to the one that had been installed at Princs Bay. In September 1913, work was nearly completed on improvements at the Pleasant Plains station, and the tower was on track to be completed in October. The Pleasant Plains station house was completely renovated, and received electric lights on the platform and in the station house. The new station opened on October 8, 1913, and the tower was completed shortly afterwards. On December 18, 1913, trains started using the new elevated structure over Crooks crossing, eliminating another grade crossing.

During fiscal year 1915, a second track was completed between Annadale and Pleasant Plains, and grade crossings elimination projects were undertaken at Amboy Road, Huguenot Park, and Pleasant Plains. On January 19, 1917, the Board of Estimate gave notice that they would hold a public hearing on January 26 to heart the application of the Staten Island Railway Company to abandon its right to double track its line between Pleasant Plains and Prince Bay. When the grade crossings at Huguenot and Great Kills were eliminated, the PSC had notified the SIRC that it should also eliminate the five grade crossings between Pleasant Plains and Prince Bay, and gave the company three years to do so, which did not happen. They had granted the company an extension of one year to complete the work, but that expired on December 26, 1916. The SIRC said that it had applied for permission to abandon its right to complete the second track as its operation did not require the double tracking of this section, and as it wanted to avoid the expense of eliminating the grade crossings and of double tracking until it was needed.

In August 1917, the PSC adopted an order directing the SIRT and other railways to keep the gates at 33 grade crossings closed between midnight and 5 a.m. for vehicle safety. However, due to World War I and issues with nearby grade crossing elimination projects, this work was delayed.

On April 13, 1922, the SIRT petitioned to the PSC to move Bay Terrace station  to the east of the station to Lincoln Road and to renamed the station Rice Manor. The PSC denied the application as the move would allow fewer people to use the station. There were 35 homes immediately surrounding the existing station while there were only 3 at the proposed location. The move was intended to spur development in the surrounding area.

Increase in traffic 
In 1890 and 1906, respectively, the car float terminal and freight yard at Saint George and Arlington Yard were opened. The two main freight yards on Staten Island, Arlington and Saint George, were at capacity, and in 1912, to ease the congestion, the B&O began running freight via the Jersey Central into Jersey City. The B&O profited from the heavy coal trade that operated via the lines on Staten Island. In 1920, 4,000,000 tons of freight had been handled on the railway. In addition, passenger traffic on the line increased. Between 1903 and 1920, daily trips on the North Shore Branch increased from 50 to 65; from 50 to 60 on the South Beach Branch; and from 22 to 34 on the Tottenville Branch. In 1920, 65 trains ran daily on the North Shore Branch; 60 trains ran daily on the South Beach Branch; and 34 trains ran daily on the Tottenville Branch. Most of the railway's passengers used the North Shore and South Beach branches. In 1920, 8,000,000 passengers used the North Shore and South Beach branches while 5,000,000 passengers used the main line. Up to 1921, 3,369,400 trains had been operated on the SIRT with no fatalities.

Electrification: 1923–1925 

On June 2, 1923, the Kaufman Act was signed by Governor Al Smith, mandating that all railroads in New York City–including the SIRT—be electrified by January 1, 1926. As a result, the B&O drew up electrification plans, which were submitted to the PSC. The plans were approved by the PSC on May 1, 1924, and construction began on August 1, 1924. The SIRT was to be electrified using 600 volt D.C. third-rail power distribution so it would be compatible with the Brooklyn–Manhattan Transit (BMT) once a planned tunnel was completed under the Narrows to Brooklyn, connecting the line to the BMT Fourth Avenue Line of the New York City Subway system. The B&O planned to use this tunnel to connect its freight from New Jersey to freight terminals in Brooklyn and Queens, including to a planned port at Jamaica Bay. The city started construction on the Narrows tunnel in 1924. Due to political pressure and the project's increasing cost, the freight tunnel portion of the plan was eliminated in 1925, and the entire project was halted in 1926. Only the shafts at either end were constructed.  The SIRT ordered ninety electric motors and ten trailers (later converted to motors) from the Standard Steel Car Company to replace the old steam equipment. These cars, the ME-1s, were designed to be similar to the Standards in use by the BMT.

The first electric train was operated on the South Beach Branch between South Beach and Fort Wadsworth on May 20, 1925, and regular electric operation began on the branch on June 5, 1925. As part of the electrification project, the South Beach Branch was extended one stop to Wentworth Avenue from the previous terminus at South Beach. Wentworth Avenue had a short, wooden, half-car platform, and a shelter was built there. That location had previously been used as a servicing and turning point for the line's steam-powered locomotives. Electric service began on the Perth Amboy sub-division on July 1, 1925, to much fanfare. The North Shore Branch's electrification was completed on December 25, 1925, and resulted in a time savings of ten minutes from Arlington to St. George. Following the electrification of all three branches, service was increased by nineteen trains on the Perth Amboy sub-division, by the fifteen trains on the South Beach Branch, and by five trains on the North Shore Branch.

Because of the high cost of electrification, however, St. George and Arlington Yards, along with the Mount Loretto Spur, and the Travis Branch were not electrified. Thirteen steam engines were retired and four new, wholly automatic substations opened at South Beach, Old Town Road, Eltingville, and Tottenville. The SIRT's old semaphore signals were replaced by new color position light signals. This was the first permanent use of the type of signal on the B&O–it later became the railroad's standard. A modern signaling system was put into place in the Saint George Yards, allowing one dispatcher to do all the work. The Clifton Junction Shops were updated to maintain electric equipment rather than steam equipment, and a large portion of the yard was electrified. Grade crossing elimination began between Prince's Bay and Pleasant Plains. While electrification was being installed, the system's roadbed was rebuilt with 100-pound rail.

The promise of a faster, more reliable electrified service spurred developers and private individuals to purchase land alongside the SIRT lines, with the intention of providing housing to attract residents to Staten Island. On July 2, 1925, for the first time since its opening, the railroad stopped reserving its trains' first car for smokers. A petition was sent to the railroad to reverse this decision.

In the end of 1924, work began on a project to elevated the track to eliminate six grade crossings on the Perth Amboy Division between Pleasant Plains and Princess Bay and to add  of double-track to complete the double-tracking of the entire line. The cost of the project was shared by the SIR, New York State, and New York City. Work on this project was completed in 1926, and the State made the final payment on the project on August 15, 1927. Work on the $1,050,000 project was 85 percent complete at the start of 1926. One June 23, 1926, the Transit Commission ordered the elimination of a grade crossing at Bay Street in Clifton through the elevation of the train tracks for $573,000, and the elimination of the Tompkins Avenue, Hope Avenue, and Belair Road crossings in Fort Wadsworth for $647,000. The order called for the closure of the Belair Road crossing and for the partial depression of the tracks and elevation of the streets to allow Tompkins Avenue and Hope Avenue to pass over the South Beach Branch. The SIRT sued to test the validity of these orders by the Transit Commission, but the orders were upheld by the New York State Court of Appeals. In 1927, the SIRT planned on appealing this decision to the Supreme Court of the United States. On November 24, 1926, the Transit Commission ordered the elimination of the Tompkins Avenue grade crossing in Clifton through the elevation of the street over the rail line. The estimated cost of this project was $281,000.

In 1927, work on the Virginia Avenue grade crossing elimination project was still not underway. The SIRT had requested that the Transit Commission's order be modified on October 22, 1926, but this request was denied. On July 12, 1937, the first hearings were held on the Port Richmond—Mariners Harbor Elimination project, which would eliminate 21 grade crossings on the North Shore Division for $4 million.

In 1926, the New York State Transit Commission ordered the installation of automatic signals at 18 grade crossings on the SIR for $47,000. These signals were in operation since the middle of September 1927.

Expansion 
In the 1920s, a branch was built to haul materials to construct the Outerbridge Crossing. The branch ran along the West Shore from the Richmond Valley station, and originally ended at Allentown Lane in Charleston, past the end of Drumgoole Boulevard. The branch was cut back south of the bridge after the bridge was completed. The Gulf Oil Corporation opened a dock and tank farm along the Arthur Kill in 1928; to serve it, the Travis Branch was built south from Arlington Yard into the marshes of the island's western shore to Gulfport. At this time, the B&O proposed to join the two branches along the West Shore. The West Shore Line, once completed, would have allowed trains to run between Arlington on the North Shore sub-division and Tottenville on the Perth Amboy sub-division. In addition, freight from the Perth Amboy sub-division would no longer be delayed by the congestion of Saint George Yard and the frequent passenger service of the SIRT. This proposal was canceled because of the Great Depression.

In the 1930s, there was a proposal to build a loop joining the Perth Amboy sub-division at Grasmere with the North Shore Branch at Port Richmond. There also was a proposal to join the North Shore Branch to Tottenville without using the existing West Shore tracks. Staten Island Borough President Joseph A. Palma, in 1936, proposed to extend Staten Island Rapid Transit to Manhattan (via New Jersey) across the Bayonne Bridge, which had been built to accommodate two train tracks. The Port of New York Authority endorsed the second plan in 1937, with a terminal at 51st Street in Manhattan near Rockefeller Center to serve the trains of Erie, West Shore, Lackawanna, Jersey Central, and trains from Staten Island. This original proposal would be brought back in 1950, by Edward Corsi, a Republican candidate for Mayor of New York City.

In 1931, Cedar Avenue station opened with the construction of wooden platforms at the Cedar Avenue grade crossing on the South Beach Branch.

On February 4, 1932, the headway on trains was decreased to 15 minutes from 20 minutes between 9:29 p.m. and 10:29 p.m.; and was decreased to 30 minutes from 40 minutes between 10:29 p.m. and 1:29 a.m. on the Perth Amboy Division.

On June 14, 1948, a bill to permit the SIRT to widen its railroad tunnel at the Saint George Ferry Terminal was signed into law. The tunnel allowed for the laying of a third track, and permitted the operation of more trains from Saint George to Tottenville and South Beach. The extra track also facilitated better handling of trains at the ferry terminal at Saint George.

Grade crossing elimination: 1926–1950 
On June 25, 1926, the Transit Commission ordered the elimination of four grade crossings on Staten Island—at Bay Street in Clifton, and at Hope Avenue, Belair Road, and Tompkins Avenue in Fort Wadsworth. The project would cost $1,000,000, with half of the cost going to the railroad and a quarter each to the city and state. At the time, the grade crossing at Bay Street was thought of as the most dangerous grade crossing on Staten Island. The SIRT sued the Transit Commission, arguing that it did not have the power to order the construction of such projects. The Court of Appeals ruled in favor of the Transit Commission on July 23, 1926. The case was carried to the Supreme Court, which decided to hear the case "for a lack of jurisdiction."

On November 27, 1929, the Transit Commission held hearings on proposals to eliminate eleven grade crossings in Dongan Hills and Grasmere at Old Town Road, Buell Avenue, Liberty Avenue, Sea View Avenue, Garretson Avenue, Cromwell Avenue, Tysen Avenue, Burgher Avenue, Clove Avenue, Parkinson Avenue and Grasmere Avenue. On September 14, 1932, the Transit Commission approved plans for the elimination of these eleven grade crossings.

The elimination of grade crossings continued in the 1930s in all three sub-divisions. On the Perth Amboy sub-division, a large grade-elimination project took place on the southern portion of the line. The project was completed in 1934; new brick stations were built and the single-track portion of the line that ran through Skunk's Misery was double-tracked; the latter requiring a lot of rock fill.

The Grasmere–Dongan Hills grade crossing elimination project was completed in 1934. The project eliminated eleven crossings and cost $1,576,000. The crossings were removed by putting the line in an open cut through Grasmere and elevating it through Dongan Hills. As part of the project, a new street—North Railroad Avenue— was constructed, paralleling the line's north side from Clove Road to Parkinson Avenue.

The East Shore sub-division was elevated in 1936–1937 to remove several grade crossings. A huge undertaking was required to remove grade crossings on the North Shore sub-division. The Port Richmond-Tower Hill viaduct was built to remove eight grade crossings; it was longer than a mile and became the largest grade crossing elimination project in the United States. The viaduct opened on February 25, 1937, marking the final part of a $6,000,000 grade crossing elimination project on Staten Island, which eliminated 34 grade crossings on the north and south shores. A two-car special train, which carried Federal, state, and borough officials, made a run over the viaduct and the seven-mile project. Stations closed for the viaduct project at Tower Hill and Port Richmond were reopened on this date.

Between 1938 and 1940, a grade crossing elimination project was undertaken over three miles between Great Kills and Huguenot, eliminating seven grade crossings and costing $2,136,000, which was partially paid for by the city, state, and Progress Work Administration funds. The line was depressed into an open cut between Great Kills and Huguenot, with the exception of a section through Eltingville where it was elevated. Four stations—Great Kills, Eltingville, Annadale and Huguenot—were completely replaced with new stations along the rebuilt right-of-way. The project started on July 13, 1938, and was completed in October 1940. The stations themselves were completed in 1939, and therefore have the date 1939 inscribed either on road overpasses or on railroad bridges.

In that same year, grade crossing eliminations were completed in Richmond Valley and Tottenville. The Richmond Valley project eliminated the crossing at Richmond Valley Road and cost $300,000 while the Tottenville project eliminated seven crossings—including one at Main Street—and cost $997,000. The only remaining grade crossings to be removed were at Grant City, New Dorp, Oakwood Heights, and Bay Terrace. These projects were delayed due to material shortages during World War II. In 1949, a project to eliminate 13 grade crossings on the Perth Amboy sub-division, at Grant City, New Dorp, Oakwood Heights and Bay Terrace, was set to begin, with a projected cost of $7,400,000. On August 30, 1950, the PSC announced a $6,500,000 plan to eliminate grade crossings of the SIRT. The plan was only approved with the assurance from the city that if passenger service was discontinued, the city would guarantee residents of the area would have some form of public transportation. The plan also included the construction of a bridge over the never-built Willowbrook Expressway.

World War II 
Freight and World War II traffic helped pay off some of the debt the SIRT had accumulated, briefly making it profitable. B&O freight trains operated to Staten Island and Jersey City. Around this time, B&O crews began running through without changing at different junctions. Regular B&O crews and Staten Island crews were separated, meaning the crews had to change before they could enter Staten Island. All traffic to and from Cranford Junction in New Jersey was handled by the SIRT crews. During the war, all east coast military hospital trains were handled by the SIRT—the trains came onto Staten Island through Cranford Junction, with some trains stopping at Arlington to transfer wounded soldiers to Halloran Hospital. Freight tonnage doubled on the SIRT between 1942 and 1944 to a record 3.2 million tons. The Baltimore and New York Railway line become extremely busy, handling 742,000 troops, 100,000 prisoners-of-war, and war material operating over this stretch to reach their destinations. Two B&O subsidiaries, the B&NY and the SIRT, were merged on December 31, 1944. Since the Baltimore and New York Railway opened in 1890, the SIRT operated this line with locomotives belonging to itself and to its parent company, the B&O. Around the time of World War II, the B&O operated special trains for important officials. One special was operated for former Prime Minister of the United Kingdom, Sir Winston Churchill. The train took him to Stapleton, from where he boarded a ship to Europe. The SIRT made special arrangements for the trip, including a shined-up locomotive sporting polished rods, white tires, and an engine crew clad in white uniforms.

Fires 

Tottenville station was destroyed by a fire on September 3, 1929. The fire was attributed to a short-circuited third rail. The two -long platforms were destroyed, as were five train cars being stored near the station. The damage was estimated to cost $200,000. Passengers using the Perth Amboy Ferry were forced to use the nearby Atlantic station instead.

On June 25, 1946, a fire wrecked the terminal at Saint George, killing three people and causing damage worth $22,000,000. The fire destroyed the ferry terminal and the four slips used for Manhattan service, the terminal for Staten Island Rapid Transit trains, and a small building and slip owned by the city and used by the Army and Navy to transport personnel from Staten Island to the United States Naval Depot at Bayonne, New Jersey. Twenty rail cars were also destroyed in the fire. Since the power circuits were melted, the electric MUs were trapped in the station. Diesel cars were sent to rescue them, but wouldn't couple with the MUs due to their different coupling systems. Some cars were saved through the use of rigging tow chains, but precious minutes were lost. 5 cars were totally destroyed in the fire, while 16 suffered heavy damage. A few cars were sent to Clifton shops, with the others kept at St. George with their windows boarded up.

Two days after the fire, the city voted $3,000,000 to start work on a new $12,000,000 terminal that would be opened in 1948. Until a temporary terminal could be built at Saint George, Tompkinsville was used as the main terminal. Even though the station was very narrow and its facilities were inadequate, service continued without an issue and without any injuries. The station handled the equivalent of 128 passenger loads per day.

On June 8, 1951, a modern replacement terminal for Saint George opened, although portions of the terminal were phased into service at earlier dates.

Service scaledowns and the end of B&O operation: 1947–1971

Transfer of ferry service: 1947–1948
On October 28, 1947, the SIRT filed with the Interstate Commerce Commission (ICC) to get permission to discontinue ferry service between Tottenville and Perth Amboy Ferry Slip in Perth Amboy, New Jersey. The SIRT said the abandonment should be permitted because of "the substantial deficits being incurred in operation of the service, which covers a distance of 3,600 feet". On September 22, 1948, the ICC allowed the SIRT to abandon the ferry, which it had been operating for 88 years. On October 16, the ferry operation was transferred to Sunrise Ferries of Elizabeth, New Jersey, which had agreed to lease the railway's ferry facilities at Tottenville and to lease Perth Amboy wharf and dock properties there. The schedules and the five-cent fare for the ferry were maintained. In 1963, Perth Amboy ferry service was discontinued.

Service cuts and the discontinuation of service: 1948–1953

On October 28, 1947, Mayor John Delaney of Perth Amboy created a plan to fight the SIRT's proposal to abandon service between St. George and Tottenville. The Mayor criticized the railroad for failing to notify the city of its intentions. This effort to discontinue service failed, but on July 1, 1948, the New York City Board of Transportation took over all of the bus lines on Staten Island. As a result, the bus fare on Staten Island dropped from five cents per zone (twenty cents Tottenville to the ferry) to seven cents for the whole island, to match the fare of the other city-owned bus lines. The cheaper bus fare resulted in an exodus of passengers from the SIRT. In 1947, the SIRT had carried 12.3 million passengers but after the decrease in bus fares the number decreased to 8.7 million in 1948 and to 4.4 million in 1949. Three months after the change, passenger traffic dropped 32 percent on the Tottenville Division and 40 percent on the other two divisions. The buses saw a 25 percent increase in ridership.

Due to the loss of ridership, on August 28, 1948, the SIRT announced it would reduce service on all three branches on September 5. Service would be reduced from 15-minute intervals in non-rush hours to 30 minutes during that time, and from 5 to 10 minutes in rush hours to 10 to 15 minutes during rush hours. The day afterwards, Richmond Borough President Cornelius A. Hall and Staten Island civic organizations announced they would oppose the proposed cuts. The PSC elected not to prevent the cut in service on September 2, 1948, and the cut went into effect three days later. 237 of the previous 492 weekday trains were cut and the schedule of expresses was reduced during rush hours. In addition, all night trains after 1:29 a.m. were eliminated. The reduction of trips resulted in the firing of 30 percent of the company's personnel.

On September 7, 1948, Borough President Hall continued to oppose the SIRT's cuts at a PSC hearing in Manhattan. Commuters testified that trains were missing connections to ferry boats and that some trains were being held at the St. George Terminal during rush hour to wait for two boatloads of passengers. Previously, they said, the trains pulled out with only one boatload of passengers. On September 13, 1948, the SIRT agreed to add four trains and to extend the schedule of four others. On January 5, 1949, the PSC recommended the SIRT restore the service cut; if it refused, the PSC would order the SIRT to restore the service. Hall suggested lowering the fare to 10 cents or a 20-cent round trip to make the service more competitive with the buses on the island. On January 29, 1949, the PSC ordered the SIRT to restore five trains and to reschedule seven other trains for public convenience, and gave the SIRT until February 13 to carry out the order.

On May 20, 1949, the SIRT announced it intended to discontinue all of its passenger services and that it would seek permission from the PSC to do so, citing the loss of $1,061,716 in 1948. The PSC response was to rule that the railroad must continue its operations or substitute them with buses, otherwise the city should take over the railroad service as part of the municipal transit system. The SIRT made another request to discontinue its passenger service on June 3, 1952, with a date set of July 7. On June 16, the PSC ordered the SIRT to continue all of its passenger services pending a decision on the line's request to abandon its service. On July 9, hearings concerning the proposed abandonment of the railroad began. On July 16, the PSC counsel stated the operating deficits that had been charged to the SIRT's passenger service would disappear if they were included with the freight profits of the B&O in the New York area. After the hearings, the SIRT changed its planned abandonment date to September 12, 1952. The commissioner council said a provision for an additional two months of service, extending it to November 12, 1952, needed to be made.

On December 19, 1952, the PSC gave the SIRT permission to discontinue service on the North Shore Branch and South Beach Branch after March 31, 1953, because of city-operated bus competition. The discontinuation brought the SIRT an estimated annual saving of $308,000. The South Beach Branch was abandoned shortly thereafter while the North Shore Branch continued to carry freight. Bus service on parallel lines was increased to make up for the loss of service on these branches. By 1955, the third rails on both of the lines were removed.

City steps in to subsidize Tottenville service: 1954–1971 
While the SIRT had successfully discontinued service on the North Shore Branch and South Beach Branch, it was not successful in its endeavors to discontinue service to Tottenville. On September 7, 1954, the SIRT made an application to discontinue all passenger service on the Tottenville sub-division on October 7, 1954. The PSC warned that if it discontinued its passenger service, action would be taken to remove the SIRT's parent company, the B&O Railroad, from Staten Island, meaning the end of its prospering freight operation. A large city subsidy allowed passenger service on the Tottenville sub-division to continue. Since this sub-division did not need the trains cars left over from the closure of the North Shore and South Beach lines, the SIRT sold 35 of them, of which 5 were trailers, to the New York City Transit Authority (NYCTA) in 1953–1954 for $10,000 each.

A bill allowing New York City to lease service on the Tottenville line was approved by Governor Harriman on March 20, 1956, paving the way for an agreement between the city and the B&O. On December 13, 1956, the PSC approved an agreement between the B&O and New York City that ensured the Tottenville line would continue to operate; as part of the deal, New York City leased the line's passenger facilities for 20 years and received a small percentage of the line's net income. The SIRT continued to collect revenue and operate service. In addition, the city repaid all taxes owed by the railroad to the city. The agreement went into effect on January 1, 1957. The SIRT's financial troubles continued and in February 1960, it asked the city for $3,870,000 in subsidies, threatening to ask the PSC for permission to discontinue the service if the funds were not provided. In 1959, the SIRT lost $1,100,000, with an average daily ridership of 4,000. On August 25, 1960, the Board of Estimate approved an amendment of the city's contract with the SIRT to increase the annual subsidy. Over the next ten years, the aid was increased from $4,000,000 to $8,400,000.

On April 5, 1962, a fire at Clifton Yard destroyed seven ME-1 train cars and a warehouse, adding to 13 lost in two previous fires and two that were scrapped, leaving the SIRT with only 48 cars to operate regular service. This car shortage meant 44 of its 48 train cars were in service during rush hours, leaving a small margin for errors. To maintain the previous level of service, the SIRT had carefully scheduled maintenance for their train cars; a number of trains were rushed back to Saint George as passenger-free expresses after dropping their loads in the evening rush, helping make up for the lack of train cars. The NYCTA set aside nine BMT Standards for possible transfer to the SIRT. The SIRT also looked at a proposal to transfer some D-type cars. Neither of the proposals were acted upon.

On July 13, 1967, Mayor John Lindsay announced the city was considering purchasing the 48 air conditioned train cars used at Montreal's Expo 67 to transport passengers between the city and the exposition grounds. The cars would have cost $3,840,000, or about $80,000 each, and were expected to be available in October once the fair closed. These cars were 11.7 percent larger than the cars then in service on the SIRT.

Freight operations: 1957–1971 

On October 21, 1957, four years after North Shore sub-division passenger trains ended, a train from Washington, D.C.—the last SIRT special—carried Queen Elizabeth II and Prince Philip across the Arthur Kill Bridge en route to the Staten Island Ferry after a meeting with President Eisenhower. The special train movement was conducted in secrecy and the tracks along the route were cleared for this occasion. The train traveled over B&O, Reading Company, and Lehigh Valley lines to get to Staten Island Junction and the SIRT. The royal train, along with a press train, ended its run at a freight yard at Stapleton.

In November 1947, the Arthur Kill swing bridge was knocked off its center pier foundation by a passing oil tanker, rendering the bridge useless. Freight had to be rerouted through float bridges, with most of it passing through the Central Railroad of New Jersey's yards. The bridge was then condemned by the Army Corps of Engineers. Work on a replacement span started in 1955.  On August 25, 1959, the damaged bridge was replaced with a state-of-the-art, single track,  vertical lift bridge. The 2,000 ton lift span was prefabricated then floated into place. The new bridge was raised ; because the new bridge aided navigation on the Arthur Kill, the United States Government assumed 90 percent of the $11,000,000 cost of the project. The old bridge had been condemned and ordered replaced by the United States Secretary of the Army in 1949, with an expected cost of $8,000,000 to be split between the SIRT and the U.S. Government. When the bridge reopened, long-unit coal trains from West Virginia began using an extension of the Travis Branch, on Staten Island's West Shore to serve a new Consolidated Edison power plant in Travis.

The closure of Bethlehem Steel in 1960 and of U.S. Gypsum in 1972 led to a dramatic decline in rail traffic via the Arthur Kill Bridge, although there still was enough traffic in the 1970s to keep car floats reasonably busy.

Final grade-crossing elimination: 1960–1964 
On November 7, 1960, an accident took place at the grade crossing at North Railroad Avenue and Bancroft Avenue, four blocks away from the New Dorp station. An eight-year-old girl was killed and 31 children were injured as a train struck a crowded school bus as it was about to exit the crossing. A grand jury had ordered the closure of this crossing and 12 others along this stretch of the line, after a train killed a high-school girl at a crossing eight blocks away in December 1959. The railroad had been given an extension of time so it could install gates. On November 10, 1960, Staten Island Borough President Albert Maniscalco ordered the closure of this grade crossing and announced that he expected work on eliminating the grade crossing to begin the following year.

On August 29, 1964, the PSC approved a $10,923,000 project to eliminate the last remaining grade-crossings on the line between the Jefferson Avenue and Grant City stations. As part of the project, new platforms and station buildings were built at New Dorp and Grant City, and new platforms were built at Jefferson Avenue. To eliminate the grade crossing, the line was raised on an embankment for part of the way and was depressed into an open cut for the rest. To avoid interfering with train service, a temporary track was constructed to the east of the original line and a new, crossing-free line was constructed upon the original right of way.

Following the 1964 opening of the Verrazzano-Narrows Bridge, which directly connected Staten Island with the rest of the city by road, ridership on the SIRT, which had been steadily increasing at a rate of 300,000 a year in the early 1960s, increasing 34 percent between 1960 and 1964, precipitously declined. Annual ridership decreased from 6.4 million in 1964 to 5.7 million in 1965. The previous ridership growth had been despite increasing car ownership.

City operation of passenger service: 1971–present

Transfer to MTA operation: 1968–1971

In May 1968, the President of the Metropolitan Transportation Authority (MTA), William Ronan, proposed that New York City take control of the SIRT and spend $25 million on modernizing the line. This proposal was part of a 20-year, $2.9-billion plan announced by the agency on February 28. Some of the money allocated to the SIRT would be used to purchase new trains. On December 18, 1969, the Board of Estimate approved the purchase of the SIRT for $1 and the use of $3.5 million to purchase the line's 48 cars,  of real estate, the air rights over the tracks, and the line's Clifton Shops. The additional land was purchased to allow for a wider right-of-way, parking lots, and station improvements. As part of the agreement, the B&O would continue to operate freight service over the line once a day.

On January 1, 1970, New York City's lease of the Tottenville line was terminated; after that date the city reimbursed the railroad for its passenger deficits. On May 29, 1970, New York City and the SIRT entered an agreement for NYC to purchase the Tottenville line, as part of which the SIRT was reserved the right to operate freight service over the line. The city was required to ensure the track was in good condition for SIRT's freight operations. The freight operation was reorganized as the Staten Island Railroad Corporation. On June 29, 1970, the Staten Island Rapid Transit Operating Authority was incorporated as a subsidiary of the state's MTA to acquire and operate the SIRT.

On April 21, 1971, the ICC approved the city's purchase of the line. On July 1, 1971, operation of the Tottenville line was turned over to the Staten Island Rapid Transit Operating Authority, a division of the state's MTA. The line itself was purchased by the City of New York for $1 and the MTA paid the B&O $3.5 million for the line's equipment. Grade crossings along the Tottenville line had to be removed by the B&O to finalize the deal. Grade crossings were supposed to have been eliminated in the 1930s but a lack of finances—partially resulting from the Great Depression and World War II—prevented it.

Despite MTA improvements, problems persist: 1970s and 1980s 

On June 15, 1972, five 1955-built, air-conditioned coaches on loan from the Long Island Rail Road (LIRR) went into service on the SIRT. One three-car train made one round trip during the morning and operated again during the afternoon peak. The cars were only  longer than the 45 cars in operation but had a seating capacity of 123 passengers—almost double the capacity of the other coaches.

On February 1, 1972, the fare on the SIRT was increased for the first time since 1958, to 35 cents from an average fare of 22 cents; the system used to have zoned fares. The fare increase applied to the whole system and was accompanied by the elimination of commutation tickets and student tickets. Previously, fares ranged from 20 to 35 cents. Sixteen percent of riders of the 17,000 daily riders had no change in fare. There was a 10 percent increase for 51 percent of passengers and a 15 percent increase for the remaining 33 percent. The fare increase was expected to bring in an extra $400,000 a year.

At the time, the line was operating at a deficit of $2.9 million a year, with $2.5 million of it offset by a subsidy from the city. The MTA had plans for a $25 million improvement program for the line including new train cars. Improvements were also planned for the tower and signal systems, for the roadbed and for the stations. Increased power,  of new rails, and mercury-vapor lighting at 14 of the 22 stations were also part of the plan. Three quarters of the $25 million were to be provided by 1967 state transportation bond issue and the remaining $6.25 million was to be paid by the city.

On February 28, 1973, the first six new R44 cars were put into service on the SIRT. These were part of a 52-car order from the Saint Louis Car Company—the same type of cars as the newest cars then in use on subway lines in the other boroughs. The R44s replaced the ME-1 rolling stock inherited from the B&O that had remained in continuous service since 1925 when the system was electrified.

During the 1970s, the MTA's ability to improve service on the line was hampered by several strikes by the SIRT's workers. From December 11, 1975, to April 1976, service on the SIRT was shut down because the line's 61 motormen and conductors went on strike. The strike ended once the MTA agreed to give them 14% wage increases.

In December 1976, SIRTOA recently completed projects to provide remote control of SIRT's electrical substations from the central one at St. George, and to install a two-way radio system. The former project improved the reliability of the system's power system, while the latter provided direct communication between the St. George control center and all trains, allowing information about the status of SIRT operations to be sent immediately to train staff and passengers on trains.

In December 1977, SIRTOA was preparing to begin construction on a pair of projects that would allow longer four-car trains to be run during rush hours regularly. New York City covered 25 percent of the cost of the projects, while New York State covered the remaining 75 percent. The first project was the construction of a new electrical substation capable of handling 4,000 kilowatts in Grant City, and the second was the expansion and modernization of the repair shop at Clifton Yard.

Work on the new Grant City substation building, which would cost $506,592, was expected to start in January 1978 and be completed by March 1979, while the installation of electrical equipment, which would cost $1.8 million, would begin in September 1978 and be completed in 1980. The project was the first in a series of improvement part of a long-term program to upgrade the SIRT's electrical supply and make it more reliable. In later phases, the new equipment installed in the new Grant City substation would also be installed in older substations on the line. In response to complaints from nearby residents, the design of the substation was modified to blend in with the character of the surrounding residential area, and would be constructed within the SIRT's open cut right-of-way. In addition, greenery and shrubs would be installed to beautify the structure's roof, which was located at street level. Work on the project was finally underway in April 1979, and was expected to be completed by the end of 1980.

The Clifton Yard project was planned to improve the maintenance of the SIRT's new fleet of R44 cars. This $3.9 million project, as of December 1977, was expected to begin in 1978 and be completed by the end of 1979. The project would extend and modernize the car maintenance shop, and construct new storage facilities, and a new two-story motor and wheel repair shop. The extension of the existing maintenance shop would allow the inspection pits to be rebuilt. These pits were designed to fit the ME-1 cars, which were  shorter than the R44 cars. The improvements at the shop would increase the number of cars that could be overhauled and inspected daily by 50 percent. As of April 1979, work was expected to be completed by the middle of 1980.

On August 6, 1980, an MTA committee evaluated whether it should continue operating the rail line. On September 28, 1981, Assemblyman Robert Straniere announced that half of the $25 million allocated for capital improvements to the SIRT from bond use funds would be used for improved power distribution and the modernization of stations. Eleven stations would have their platforms extended, completing the extension of platforms along the line and two stations would have their wooden platforms replaced. In addition, equipment at four substations would be improved, new switches would be installed at Tottenville interlocking, and the wye track at St. George would be realigned to fit four-car trains, among other improvements. As part of the MTA's inaugural Capital Program from 1981, Pleasant Plains and Prince's Bay stations were rebuilt and the platforms at several other stations were lengthened.

On September 23, 1985, SIRTOA began work to repair structural problems at ten stations, including crumbling stairways. Temporary access paths, platforms and stairways were constructed to allow service to be maintained while work was underway.

On October 22, 1986, midday service was reduced in frequency from one train every 20 minutes to one every 30 minutes, due to a reduction in ferry service. Weekend service was reduced by 15 trains to 78 and weekday service was reduced by 15 to 109. In the following two years, ridership reduced from 6.47 million to 6.23 million.

Improvements in fare collection: 1985–1994 
Beginning on December 18, 1985, passengers traveling between 5:50 a.m. and 10 a.m. were required to pay their fares after they exit the train. People exiting at St. George were required to pay their fares by dropping a pre-purchased ticket in a box near twelve turnstiles, which were rearranged to reduce backups. Previously these turnstiles were only used for evening rush hours. At other stations, riders were to pay their fares as they exited station platforms. The change was made to reduce fare evasion. Despite the fact that ridership on the railroad increased 38 percent since 1977, revenue did not grow as conductors collecting tickets often could not get to all passengers in time due to crowding on trains. At the time, tickets could be purchased at Tottenville and St. George at all times, or from Grant City, New Dorp, Dongan Hills, Oakwood Heights, Eltingville and Great Kills between 6 a.m. and 2 p.m.

Tokens began to be accepted at St. George on April 20, 1988. A month later, tokens were used by 80 percent of riders. Tokens could be bought at vending machines between 6 a.m. and 10 a.m. at Huguenot, Annadale, Eltingville, Great Kills, Oakwood Heights, New Dorp, Grant City, and Dongan Hills, and at St. George at all times. On October 18, 1992, the NYCTA began distributing free transfers between the SIRT and bus routes on Staten Island.

On March 31, 1994, MetroCards began being accepted for fare payment at the St. George station, making it the 50th subway or Staten Island Railway station to accept it. On July 4, 1997, the MTA eliminated fares for trips between Tompkinsville and Tottenville. This fare cut was part of the "One City, One Fare" fare cuts in 1997. The change was made, in part, because no turnstiles were installed at any of the other stations along the line. Riders using St. George began having to pay while entering and exiting. Previously, fares were collected on board by the conductor. Passengers on weekday trains arriving at St. George between 5:50 a.m. and 10:50 a.m. had to pay their fares with a token, special fare ticket, or a transfer when they exited. MetroCards were accepted at St. George while cash, transfers, tokens, and special fare tickets were accepted by conductors at the other stations. Also on July 4, 1997, the Staten Island Ferry was made free. The union representing the SIR's workers, United Transportation Union local 1440, was worried about the change, in part because of an expected rise in ridership. The removal of fares was blamed for an immediate spike of crime along the line.

Rebranding and service improvements: 1990s 

The MTA rebranded the Staten Island Rapid Transit as the MTA Staten Island Railway (SIR) on April 2, 1994; Staten Island Railway was the line's original name. This move followed the transfer of the Staten Island Rapid Transit from the New York City Transit Authority's Surface Transit Division to the Department of Rapid Transit on July 26, 1993.

In December 1991, late-night service on the SIRT changed from four-car trains to two-car trains. This change was originally intended to go into effect by June 1988. In 1988, it was decided to transfer 12 R44 cars from the New York City Subway to the SIR in anticipation of expanding trains to five cars to accommodate an expected growth in ridership and to reduce overcrowding, which did not materialize. During the mid-2000s, some trains did run with five cars. The SIR timetable stated, "Select rush hour trains operate with additional cars. For a more comfortable ride, please use all available cars." Platforms at 18 stations were lengthened to accommodate five-car trains in 1988.

In 1993, the Dongan Hills station became accessible under the Americans with Disabilities Act of 1990. In 1998, renovations were completed at St. George, Tompkinsville, Stapleton, New Dorp, Richmond Valley and Tottenville.

On April 7, 1999, three additional afternoon express runs, which skipped stops between St. George and Great Kills, were added to the schedule, almost doubling the previously scheduled express service.

On June 24, 2001, a small section of the easternmost portion of the North Shore Branch (a few hundred feet) was reopened to provide passenger service to the new Richmond County Bank Ballpark, home of the Staten Island Yankees minor-league baseball team. The station cost $3.5 million to build. One train was scheduled to travel to/from Tottenville and two or three shuttle trains from St. George served the station. Trains last served the station in September 2009 and the service was discontinued as part of budget cuts on June 18, 2010, the day of the first scheduled home game for the Yankees. The elimination of this service saved $30,000 annually.

Consistent growth: 2000s and 2010s 
In 2004, the SIR put out its preliminary budget for 2005; it proposed several service cuts to offset an increased debt. For 2005, the agency proposed implementing One Person Train Operation, adding fare collection at Tompkinsville, reducing the fleet to 52 cars, eliminating express service, and reducing trains to two cars during off-peak hours. For 2006, it proposed eliminating weekend service from 2 a.m. Saturday to 5 a.m. Monday. Starting on May 1, 2005, SIR trains started running with two cars between 9 p.m. to 5 a.m. every night, stopping near station entrances to deter crime.

In June 2005, a new cab signaling system and a new control center went into effect at St. George; the system is still in use  and has received minor upgrades. These improvements cost $100 million and helped enhance safety and increase operational flexibility. The new signal system provided improved signal visibility, continuous speed enforcement, and central monitoring at St. George, and the ability to remotely change switch positions; all switches on the main line were interlocked as part of the project. The cab signalling system sounds an alarm inside the cab to control train speeds and automatically applies the brake if needed. Prior to the new system's implementation, there were no safeguards in place to prevent trains traveling at full speed after ignoring a signal and continuing past a bumping block. The signals system limits the maximum speed at certain points and at sharp curves, and limits trains to  when approaching a terminal.

On July 17, 2006, rush-hour express service was sped up, with all morning express trains running non-stop from New Dorp to St. George. Evening express service started earlier under the new timetable. In response to record ridership growth on the SIR, rush-hour express service was expanded in late 2007. Evening service was expanded on November 14 when five additional express trains were added, expanding the span of express service by 80 minutes. Morning service express service was expanded on December 5. The span of express service was extended by 45 minutes during the morning with the addition of three express trains. Express service was also added in the off-peak direction to Tottenville during the morning, with five express trips leaving St. George. Five local trains were also added to the schedule.

A new stationhouse at Tompkinsville opened on January 20, 2010, with turnstiles installed for the first time. The stationhouse cost $6.9 million, and was equipped with low turnstiles and fare vending machines. The turnstiles were installed because passengers often avoided paying the fare by exiting at Tompkinsville and taking a short,  walk to the St. George ferry terminal. It was estimated the SIR lost $3.4 million every year as a result. Trains heading to St. George during the morning rush hour, and trains leaving St. George in the evening rush hour had skipped Tompkinsville and Stapleton in an effort to reduce fare evasion. Service stopped at these stations every hour while all other rush hour trains bypassed them. After the installation of the turnstiles, the revenue generated at Tompkinsville made up 15% of the SIR's revenue. Schedules were changed, with locals and most non-rush hour trains stopping. In 2010, it was announced the MTA planned to restore fare collection on the entire line to raise more revenue and reduce crime. This was planned to be implemented once the MetroCard was replaced with a smartcard. In the interim, the MTA proposed installing turnstiles at Grasmere because it is a heavily used transfer point to the S53 bus to Brooklyn.

Completion of the study is necessary to qualify the project for the estimated $360 million. A preliminary study found ridership could reach 15,000 daily. U.S. Senator Chuck Schumer from New York requested $4 million of federal funding for a detailed feasibility study. In 2012, the MTA released an analysis of transportation solutions for the North Shore, which included proposals for the reintroduction of heavy rail, light rail, or bus rapid transit using the North Shore line's right-of-way. Other options included transportation systems management, which would improve existing bus service, and the possibility of future ferry and water taxi services. Bus rapid transit was preferred for its cost and relative ease of implementation, which would require $352 million in capital investment. , the project has yet to receive funding.

On May 21, 2012, Grasmere station started to be rehabilitated. The construction included demolition and rebuilding of the station platform and station house. A temporary platform and entrance were built north of the main station. Construction was finished in April 2014.

A new, ADA-compliant station named Arthur Kill, near the southern terminus of the present line, opened on January 21, 2017, after numerous delays. The station is sited between Atlantic and Nassau stations, which it replaced. Atlantic and Nassau were in the poorest condition of all the stations on the line. Unlike the Atlantic and Nassau stations, Arthur Kill is able to platform a four-car train. The MTA has provided parking for 150 automobiles near the station. Ground was broken for the $15.3 million station on October 18, 2013. The contract for the project was awarded on July 31, 2013. The building of a station at Rosebank, which would bridge the gap between Grasmere and Clifton stations—the longest gap between stations on the line—has also been discussed. A Rosebank station once existed on the now-defunct South Beach Branch of the railway.

The 2015–2019 MTA Capital Plan called for the SIR's Richmond Valley station and 32 subway stations to undergo a complete overhaul as part of the Enhanced Station Initiative. Updates would include the addition of cellular service, Wi-Fi, USB charging stations, interactive service advisories and maps, improved signage, and improved station lighting. The capital plan also called for the reconstruction of the Clifton Yard, which had been damaged during Hurricane Sandy in 2012, as well as the addition of storm walls at St. George. The St. George flood walls were finished in mid-2017, while the Clifton Yard reconstruction was to be completed in 2021.

Decline and rebirth of freight: 1971–present

Decline: 1971–2000
Through a merger with the Chesapeake and Ohio Railway, the B&O became part of the larger C&O system. The freight operation on the island was renamed the Staten Island Railroad Corporation in 1971, after it was separated from the island's passenger service. On April 1, 1976, the Federal Government created Conrail to take over the potentially profitable lines of multiple bankrupt carriers in the northeast United States; as a result the B&O and C&O became isolated from their properties in New Jersey and Staten Island. Most of their freight service, with the exception of one daily train to Cranford Junction, was truncated to Philadelphia. By 1973, the car float yard at Jersey City operated by Jersey Central had closed. Afterwards, the car float operation at Saint George Yard was brought back; the New York Dock Railway took over the operation in September 1979, but closed it the next year. Only a few isolated industries on Staten Island were using rail service for freight, essentially abandoning St. George Yard.

A lack of business led the C&O system to sell the Staten Island Railroad to the New York, Susquehanna & Western Railroad, which was owned by the Delaware Otsego Corporation on April 24, 1985. In 1990, the line's largest customer, Procter & Gamble, closed, leading to a large drop in freight traffic. The last freight train ran over the  Arthur Kill Vertical Lift Bridge in 1990 and the bridge was taken out of service on July 25, 1991. Afterwards, the North Shore Branch and the Arthur Kill Bridge were taken over by CSX. The line and bridge were purchased again in 1994, this time by the New York City Economic Development Corporation (NYCEDC), whose purchase was followed by a decade of false starts. In 1998, Conrail broke up, allowing parts of lines once operated by the competitors of the B&O to become a part of CSX. The railroad line was still intact from Cranford Junction to Arlington.

Reactivation: 2000–present
During the early 2000s, the Port Authority of New York and New Jersey announced plans to reopen the Staten Island Railroad line in New Jersey. Since the Jersey Central became a New Jersey Transit line, a new junction would be built to the ex-Lehigh Valley Railroad line. Two rail tunnels from Brooklyn were planned—one to Staten Island and one to Greenville, New Jersey—and would allow freight to pass through New York on its way from New England to the South. In December 2004, a $72 million project to reactivate freight service on Staten Island and to repair the Arthur Kill Vertical Lift Bridge was announced by the NYCEDC and the Port Authority. Specific projects on the Arthur Kill Vertical Lift Bridge included repainting the steel superstructure and rehabilitating the lift mechanism. In June 2006, the freight line connection from New Jersey to the Staten Island Railroad was completed, and became operated in part by the Morristown and Erie Railway under contract with other companies and New Jersey.

The Arthur Kill Vertical Lift Bridge was renovated in 2006 and began regular service on April 2, 2007; 16 years after it was closed. Soon after service restarted on the line, Mayor Michael Bloomberg officially commemorated the reactivation on April 17, 2007. Service was provided by CSX Transportation, Norfolk Southern Railway, and Conrail over the Travis Branch to haul waste from the Staten Island Transfer Station at Fresh Kills and ship container freight from the Howland Hook Marine Terminal and other industrial businesses. Along the remainder of the North Shore Branch, there are still tracks and rail overpasses in some places.

Notes

References

History
Companies affiliated with the Baltimore and Ohio Railroad
CSX Transportation
Defunct New York (state) railroads
Metropolitan Transportation Authority
Railway companies established in 1873
1944 mergers and acquisitions
Standard gauge railways in the United States
1899 establishments in New York City